is a 2004 real-time strategy puzzle video game developed and published by Nintendo for the GameCube home video game console. It is the direct sequel to the 2001 game Pikmin and is the second game in the Pikmin series.

Like its predecessor, Pikmin 2 focuses on exploring the surface of an unknown planet from a microscopic perspective, where the player directs and delegates tasks to a horde of tiny plant-like creatures called Pikmin. The Pikmin can be directed to destroy obstacles, defeat enemies and retrieve objects. It introduces many gameplay mechanics not seen in Pikmin, including the ability to control two different leaders of the Pikmin at once and the addition of new Pikmin types.

The game received critical acclaim, gaining aggregate scores of 89.60% and 90 on GameRankings and Metacritic, respectively. Many critics praised the additions to the Pikmin gameplay, such as the removal of the 30-day time limit imposed in the original game. Pikmin and Pikmin 2 were re-released as part of the New Play Control! series for the Wii in 2008 and 2009, respectively. On March 30, 2017, the Wii version of Pikmin 2 was digitally re-released worldwide for the Wii U. A sequel to the game, Pikmin 3, was released in 2013 for the Wii U.

Gameplay 
Pikmin 2 expands on the gameplay introduced in its predecessor, Pikmin. The player controls both Captain Olimar and Louie from a third-person microscopic perspective in a mission to retrieve treasures (which consist of human waste such as scrap metal and broken toys) from the surface of an unknown planet (called the "distant planet"). The gameplay focuses on leading and directing a horde of plant-like creatures called Pikmin to accomplish this mission. The Pikmin follow behind Olimar and/or Louie as they move around the field. The player can quickly throw individual Pikmin at enemies and obstacles, where they automatically engage in combat, destroy obstacles, or build bridges. The player can also direct the entire mob (or a subdivision) to swarm and attack enemies en masse. Because the player controls two leaders simultaneously, the player can have the leaders separate with their own Pikmin hordes and accomplish numerous tasks in the field at once. While the player can amass a limitless number of Pikmin, only up to 100 Pikmin are allowed on the game field at any time.

Because Pikmin are small and weak, they can be easily killed by hazards or devoured by enemies when misdirected or left unattended. The player can also only explore with Pikmin during daylight, one day at a time. The player begins each day at sunrise and needs to finish all tasks and collect all stray Pikmin before sunset. Pikmin that are left behind at sunset are immediately lost to ferocious nocturnal predators. This mechanic is also a major feature in Pikmin. Unlike Pikmin, however, in which the player must complete the game in thirty days, the game gives the player an unlimited number of days.

The Pikmin themselves appear in five distinct colors, which indicates their strength or immunity to hazards. Red, Blue, and Yellow Pikmin, which originally appeared in Pikmin, are resilient to fire, drowning, and electric hazards, respectively. Two new colors, Purple and White, are unique to Pikmin 2. White Pikmin are swifter than the other types, can resist poisonous gases and will poison enemies if devoured, and can locate hidden treasures buried in the soil. Purple Pikmin, while not immune to any hazards, are slower but far stronger than the others and can lift as much as 10 ordinary Pikmin. They are also heavy, and can stun enemies when thrown at them. Because of these differing characteristics, the player must choose the appropriate Pikmin that are best-suited to the task at hand. The stalk on a Pikmin's head, topped with either a leaf, bud, or flower, indicates the Pikmin's swiftness and strength, growing upon consumption of nectar harvested from various sources. More Pikmin can be bred when they carry pellets or enemy carcasses to their respective "Onion" motherships, where they can be safely stored and extracted. Purple and White Pikmin do not have their own Onions and are stored inside the Hocotate Ship. They also cannot breed; these Pikmin are created by throwing existing Pikmin into rare flowers. Pikmin 2 also introduces a sixth Pikmin type, Bulbmin, which are resistant to all hazards but are in the player's possession only temporarily. Lastly, Pikmin 2 introduced sprays that can be collected by harvesting certain plants.  The purple spray can be sprayed on enemies, and causes them to temporarily be encased in stone, making them highly vulnerable to attacks. The red spray is cast on the Pikmin and gives them a temporary boost to their speed and attack strength.

The player is able to explore four distinct locales on the distant planet, which vary in theme, enemies, and treasures found. The player is also accompanied by the Hocotate Ship's artificial intelligence, which gives the player hints and input. When a treasure is found, the Pikmin must carry it back to the Hocotate Ship, where it will be placed into the ship's cargo hold and its worth calculated. In addition to exploring the surface of each locale, there are caves scattered throughout the landscape, which the player, the Pikmin horde, and the ship's AI can enter. Caves contain multiple treasures and enemies spread across multiple sub-levels. While inside a cave, time does not pass on the surface due to a time warp caused by a strong geomagnetic field, allowing the player to explore for an indefinite period of time before sunset. However, the Pikmin Onions do not follow, meaning that the player must bring in enough Pikmin to use. Caves are also home to larger, stronger enemies that serve as the game's bosses, which upon defeat often award treasures that bestow new abilities to the player characters. Cave layouts also generate randomly with the exception of certain floors in them, generally boss floors. Caves are also the only places where the player can find the "Violet" or "Ivory" "Candypop Buds" that make Purple or White Pikmin, respectively. The player completes the game after collecting all 201 treasures.

Additional modes 
In addition to the main single-player game mode, there is both a two-player competitive mode and an unlockable challenge mode. In the competitive game mode, Olimar and Louie are each controlled by a player. In a capture the flag style gameplay, the player's objective is to either retrieve four yellow marbles or claim the opponent's marble using Pikmin. A player can launch attacks against the other's Pikmin in an effort to hinder the opponent's progress. When a player collects a cherry, an advantage is gained, such as gaining or flowering  Pikmin or summoning enemies at the opponent's base.

The challenge mode is unlocked during the single-player game. One or two players can play this mode cooperatively. Each selectable level takes place in caves of varying depth. The objective is to locate a Key treasure, used to open access to the next sub-level, within the specified time limit. The player completes the level upon finding the exit out of the cave, and is scored based on the treasures collected, the number of Pikmin surviving upon exit, and the time taken to complete the level.

Plot 
After his adventure in Pikmin, Captain Olimar returns to his home planet Hocotate. Landing at his workplace, Hocotate Freight, Olimar learns from the company's president that due to his co-worker, Louie, losing a shipment of golden Pikpik carrots to a "space rabbit", the company was forced to take out a massive loan to cover the loss. As a result, Hocotate Freight now suffers from a severe debt of pokos (the planet's currency), and as a result, Olimar's ship, the only valuable object they had, is sold off. The remaining debt is 10,100 pokos, with nothing to pay it off. Shocked, Olimar drops a bottle cap he brought back from the planet he was trapped on, whereupon a nearby ship of the company reveals it to be a treasure with considerable value, enough to start paying off the debt, now reduced to 10,000. The company president, hearing of this, decides to send Olimar and Louie to the planet to find more treasure and help pay off the debt.

Arriving back on the Pikmin's planet, Olimar and Louie are initially separated, but reunite after working with the local red Pikmin population in their area. In the process of finding treasure, the pair work with these red Pikmin, along with yellow and blue Pikmin in different areas of the planet, encountering two new species that Olimar had never encountered before, white and purple Pikmin. After finding enough treasure, Olimar takes off for Hocotate, only to realize mid-flight that Louie was accidentally left behind. Though the debt is cleared, the president decides that now they must return to find the other treasures to help strengthen the company's finances, and joins Olimar on his return trip to the Pikmin's planet to retrieve the rest, and find Louie. Eventually the pair encounters Louie in the "Dream Den" cave network on top of a giant elemental creature that harnesses the ability to switch between using fire, water, poison and electricity. After defeating the creature, Olimar and the president retrieve Louie and the final treasures, and depart the planet, leaving the Pikmin behind that helped them.

In a special epilogue, it is revealed that Louie ate the entire shipment of Pikpik brand carrots he was delivering. He then falsified his report to the president to avoid trouble, effectively causing the situation that led to Olimar's return to the Pikmin's planet.

Development 
In December 2002 a year following the release of Pikmin, game designer Shigeru Miyamoto confirmed a sequel to be in development. Development took about two and a half years; the original plan was to release it in Autumn 2003, but the team chose to delay it by six months to make further changes and revisions. Pikmin 2 was directed both by Shigefumi Hino, who focused on the graphics design, and Masamichi Abe, who focused on the game design. Miyamoto and Takashi Tezuka served as producers. Hajime Wakai composed the game soundtrack, while Kazumi Totaka served as the sound director; "Totaka's Song" is hidden twice in the game as an Easter egg. The 30-day time limit imposed in the original Pikmin was removed in order to allow players to explore the game world at a leisurely pace, which in turn increased the overall length of the game. Cooperative two-player gameplay within the main single player game was experimented, but it was found that it imposed limits on the overall game design. Multiplayer was thus relegated to a separate game mode. Pikmin 2 was first released in Japan on April 29, 2004 and then in North America, Europe, and Australasia later in the year. Nintendo e-Reader cards compatible with Pikmin 2 were released only in Japan, which contained additional minigames. Many of the treasures feature product placement for real-life brands such as Duracell.

Re-release 
In 2009 both Pikmin and Pikmin 2 were re-released for the Wii as part of the New Play Control! brand, a selection of ported GameCube games with updated Wii Remote controls. Although New Play Control! Pikmin 2 was released in Japan, Europe, and Australia that year, it was not confirmed for a North American release until three years later in the June 2012 issue of Nintendo Power and was later confirmed for a June 2012 release. The North American localization of Pikmin 2s Wii port was released as a Nintendo Selects game along with the Nintendo Selects re-release of Mario Power Tennis and is the penultimate Wii game to be published by Nintendo of America.

Reception 

Pikmin 2 received critical acclaim, gaining an aggregate score of 89.44% on GameRankings based on 58 reviews, and an aggregate score of 90 on Metacritic based on 54 reviews. GameSpot named it the best GameCube game of August 2004.  The February 2006 issue of Nintendo Power rated the game as the 47th best game made on a Nintendo System in its Top 200 Games list, and was also rated 29th on Official Nintendo Magazines 100 greatest Nintendo games of all time. GamePro labeled it one of the top five GameCube games. In 2020, IGN placed the game at #6 on their list of "the top 20 GameCube games of all time".

Many critics considered the title to be superior to its predecessor Pikmin, expressing that Pikmin 2 addressed many problems or issues seen in the original game. The removal of the 30-day time limit originally used was applauded by many critics for increasing the game's longevity, though Nintendo World Report had mixed opinions, feeling that the lack of urgency might encourage players to be "lazy." The addition of a separate multiplayer mode was praised, though the lack of LAN online-play was a disappointment to some.

Pikmin 2s strategic and puzzle-oriented gameplay was praised by many. The artificial intelligence of the Pikmin was noted by GameSpot as improved over the original, though IGN remarked on reoccurring shortcomings, such as Pikmin getting stuck behind walls or breaking away from the group.

The graphics and presentation in Pikmin 2 were highly praised; many critics felt that they were greatly improved over the original game. IGN stated that "it's highly refreshing to see a Nintendo-created game with such undeniably high production values," noting the "photorealistic" environments, particle effects, character animation, and the observation that the game constantly runs at 30 frames-per-second. GameSpot agreed, expressing that "from a performance viewpoint, Pikmin 2 stands as an impressive achievement on the GameCube, especially since the improved visuals still move at a solid frame rate despite the increased detail." Tom Bramwell of Eurogamer called Pikmin 2 "relentlessly and giddily gorgeous." Other critics, such as X-Play, did not agree about the graphics, feeling the improvements were "marginal" at best. In addition, many reviews voiced minor complaints regarding the game's camera system, which was often obstructed by large objects in the playing field when positioned at certain angles.

The staff of X-Play nominated Pikmin 2 for their 2004 "Best Strategy Game" award, which ultimately went to Rome: Total War.

Sales
During the first week of its release Pikmin 2 sold roughly 162,000 copies, going on to sell 483,000 total copies within the country. For the New Play Control! rerelease for the Wii, the game sold roughly 230,000 total copies in its lifetime.

References

External links 
 
 

New Play Control! games
2004 video games
GameCube games
Multiplayer and single-player video games
Pikmin
Video games developed in Japan
Wii games
Wii games re-released on the Nintendo eShop
Real-time strategy video games
Video games produced by Shigeru Miyamoto
Video games produced by Takashi Tezuka
Video games set on fictional planets
Games with GameCube-GBA connectivity